Bulgaria is competing at the 2013 World Aquatics Championships in Barcelona, Spain between 19 July and 4 August 2013.

Open water swimming

Bulgaria qualified a single quota in open water swimming.

Swimming

Bulgarian swimmers achieved qualifying standards in the following events (up to a maximum of 2 swimmers in each event at the A-standard entry time, and 1 at the B-standard):

Men

Women

Synchronized swimming

Bulgaria had qualified two synchronized swimmers.

References

External links
Barcelona 2013 Official Site
Bulgarian Swimming 

Nations at the 2013 World Aquatics Championships
2013 in Bulgarian sport
Bulgaria at the World Aquatics Championships